Ryan Mirsky (born November 21, 1986 in Tyler, Texas) is an American soccer player who as of 2010 was without a club.

Career

Youth and Amateur
Mirsky attended Tyler Robert E. Lee High School, and played college soccer at Southern Methodist University, where he was selected to the Conference USA All-Freshman team in 2005, and the All-Conference USA third-team as a junior.

During his college years Mirsky also played with DFW Tornados in the USL Premier Development League.

Professional
Despite being invited to the 2008 MLS Combine, Mirsky was not drafted, and having been unable to secure a professional contract elsewhere, signed with Austin Aztex U23 of the USL Premier Development League for the 2009 season. After making 11 appearances for the U23 team, Mirsky was promoted up to the Austin Aztex senior team in September 2009.

References

External links
 SMU Mustangs bio

Living people
1986 births
American soccer players
Austin Aztex FC players
Austin Aztex U23 players
DFW Tornados players
SMU Mustangs men's soccer players
USL League Two players
USL First Division players
Association football midfielders